Goos Meeuwsen (b. Arnhem, 1982) is a Dutch circus artist.

He took his first steps in juggling and the art of clowning in the Arnhem-based circusschool "Poehaa". As from age 9 he performed in the annual Worldstar Christmas Circus in Arnhem's Rijnhal. In 1998 he and his friend Ramon Hopman performed in Cirque d'Hiver in Roermond.

Meeuwsen studied at the École Nationale de Cirque de Montréal. In 2004, after graduation, he performed together with former classmates James Tanabe and Annie-Kim Déry in the show Till Tomorrow. In 2006 he had a leading part as Nowhere Man in Cirque du Soleil's show Love, performing in The Mirage, Las Vegas.

In 2008, he starred in the Swiss Cirque Starlight, and in Cirque Bouffon. At the Festival Cirque de Demain of 2008 he was awarded a prize.

In 2010 Meeuwsen stars in the new Cirque Bouffon show Angell.

References

External links
 The Agenda: Goos and friends
 Cirque d'Hiver Roermond

1982 births
Dutch clowns
People from Arnhem
Living people